Nights Behind The Tree Line is an audio book by Henry Rollins.

Track listing
 "Johnny Hartman" - 3:41
 "Maya" - 4:55
 "Brick" - 2:41
 "Polaroid" - 2:14
 "Parthenope" - 2:58
 "Kalifornia Dreaming" - 3:54
 "Coma Season" - 1:46
 "Accident" - 3:00
 "Visiting Los Angeles" - 10:39
 "Music Boy" - 1:45
 "Day of the Bed" - 3:57
 "Stalingrad" - 1:37
 "No Shore, Pt. 1" - 3:18
 "No Shore, Pt. 2" - 3:15
 "Eugene Gant" - 1:05
 "Disintegration" - 8:27

Henry Rollins albums
Spoken word albums by American artists
2004 albums
2.13.61 albums
Audiobooks by title or series